Stephen I (c. 988 – 1058) was King of Croatia from c. 1030 until his death in 1058 and a member of the Trpimirović dynasty (Krešimirović branch). Stephen I was the first Croatian king whose given name was "Stephen" ("Stjepan"), as Držislav added the name Stephen at his coronation. His ban was Stephen Praska.

Biography

Background
Stephen was the son of former King Svetoslav Suronja, who gave him as a hostage to the Venetian doge, Pietro II Orseolo. He married the latter's daughter, Hicela Orseolo, who bore him two sons: Peter Krešimir IV, who succeeded him as the King of Croatia, and Častimir, the father of the future Croatian King Stephen II.

Reign as king

Stephen formally succeeded his uncle Krešimir III in 1030, although it is likely that he co-ruled with him from 1028. The King continued his predecessors' ambitions of spreading rule over the coastal cities and expended much effort in that regard, but it was all eventually in vain.

In 1035, Croatia under Stephen involved itself in the affairs of the neighbouring Holy Roman Empire between the Carinthian count Adalbero and Holy Roman Emperor Conrad II. Aldabero was accused on 18 May 1035 during the Bamberg assembly of conspiring against the emperor with help from the Croats. Because of this, the Emperor strengthened the southeastern part of his state, where it bordered with Croatia.

Between 1038 and 1041, Stephen managed to successfully conquer Zadar from the Venetians for a short period, possibly with the help of the newly crowned Hungarian king Peter Orseolo, his wife's nephew. Stephen controlled the city until 1050, when it was reconquered by doge Domenico I Contarini.

In an effort to maintain Roman influence over the Dalmatian cities, the Byzantine emperor granted Stephen Praska, a ban serving under king Stephen I, the title of Protospatharios.

Later life and death
Stephen I established the diocese of Knin in 1040, which stretched to the north until it met the river Drava. The bishop of Knin had also the nominal title of "Croatian bishop" (Latin: episcopus Chroatensis).

Trade and commerce flourished under Stephen I. A burgeoning aristocracy emerged in Zadar, Biograd, Knin, Split and other coastal cities.

Stephen I ruled until 1058 when his son, Petar Krešimir IV, took over. His successors referenced his burial place as the "fields of Elysium" (Elisio campo). In the 1920s, when the Hollow Church was excavated, romantic nationalists interpreted this instead as "fields of Klis" (Clisio campo). Most historians assert that he was most likely buried in the Church of St Stephen on Otok.

Family
Married Hicela Orseolo c. 1008

Peter Krešimir IV of Croatia (? – 1074/1075), King of Croatia from 1059
Častimir or Gojslav (? – ?), who fathered Stephen II of Croatia, the last male Trpimirović.

See also
 Trpimirović dynasty
 History of Croatia
List of rulers of Croatia

References

Sources
 Intervju - ДИНАСТИЈЕ и владари јужнословенских народа. Special Edition 12, 16 June 1989.
 Royal Croatia

980s births
1058 deaths
Kings of Croatia
Medieval Croatian nobility
11th-century monarchs in Europe
Trpimirović dynasty
Roman Catholic monarchs
11th-century Croatian people
Burials at the Church of St. Stephen, Solin